The 2020–21 season was the 82nd season in existence of Rio Ave Futebol Clube and the club's 13th consecutive season in the top flight of Portuguese football. In addition to the domestic league, Rio Ave participated in this season's editions of the Taça de Portugal, and the UEFA Europa League. The season covered the period from July 2020 to 30 June 2021.

Players

First-team squad

Other players under contract

Out on loan

Transfers

Pre-season and friendlies

Competitions

Overview

Primeira Liga

League table

Results summary

Results by round

Matches
The league fixtures were announced on 28 August 2020.

Relegation play-offs

Taça de Portugal

UEFA Europa League

Statistics

Goalscorers

Notes

References

External links

Rio Ave F.C. seasons
Rio Ave